Taron is a multilaunch steel roller coaster manufactured by Intamin located at Phantasialand in Germany. It was the fastest multi-launched roller coaster in the world when it opened. Taron opened on 30 June 2016.

The ride is situated in the 'Klugheim' area of the theme park, a mythical village reflecting Old Norse cultures. The coaster sits in a canyon of basalt rock at the edge of the village. Also within the canyon is a new-for-2016 Family Boomerang roller coaster called Raik. Klugheim replaced the former Silver City themed area of the park.

Ride experience

Upon departure from the station, the train makes a slow U-turn onto the launch track that is parallel with the station. Once clear, the train is launched to a speed of 80km/h (49.7 mph). The layout is woven between the surrounding buildings and structures of Klugheim, and through tunnels. The riders aboard the train narrowly miss walls of faux rock faces and waterfalls. During the course of the ride, the train crosses over or under its own track 116 times at 58 intersecting track points, more than any other launched roller coaster in the world. The second launch section is in the lowest point in the canyon and it is taken without pause, accelerating the train to its top speed of 117 km/h (72.7 mph).

World records 
When opened on June 30, 2016, Taron held records for:
 Previously the fastest multilaunch roller coaster (Now held by Pantheon at Busch Gardens Williamsburg)
 Most intersecting track points on a coaster (58)

Reception

Gallery

References

External links

 
 
 
 

Steel roller coasters
Roller coasters in Germany
Roller coasters introduced in 2016
Roller coasters manufactured by Intamin
Launched roller coasters